The Dipsacales are an order of flowering plants, included within the asterid group of dicotyledons. In the APG III system of 2009, the order includes only two families, Adoxaceae and a broadly defined Caprifoliaceae. Some well-known members of the Dipsacales order are honeysuckle, elder, viburnum, and valerian.

Under the Cronquist system, the order included Adoxaceae, Caprifoliaceae sensu stricto, Dipsacaceae, and Valerianaceae.  Under the 2003 APG II system, the circumscription of the order was much the same but the system allowed either a broadly circumscribed Caprifoliaceae including the families Diervillaceae, Dipsacaceae, Linnaeaceae, Morinaceae, and Valerianaceae, or these families being kept separate. The APG III system only uses the broadly circumscribed Caprifoliceae.

The anthophytes are a grouping of plant taxa bearing flower-like reproductive structures. They were formerly thought to be a clade comprising plants bearing flower-like structures.  The group contained the angiosperms - the extant flowering plants, such as roses and grasses - as well as the Gnetales and the extinct Bennettitales.

23,420 species of vascular plant have been recorded in South Africa, making it the sixth most species-rich country in the world and the most species-rich country on the African continent. Of these, 153 species are considered to be threatened. Nine biomes have been described in South Africa: Fynbos, Succulent Karoo, desert, Nama Karoo, grassland, savanna, Albany thickets, the Indian Ocean coastal belt, and forests.

The 2018 South African National Biodiversity Institute's National Biodiversity Assessment plant checklist lists 35,130 taxa in the phyla Anthocerotophyta (hornworts (6)), Anthophyta (flowering plants (33534)), Bryophyta (mosses (685)), Cycadophyta (cycads (42)), Lycopodiophyta (Lycophytes(45)), Marchantiophyta (liverworts (376)), Pinophyta (conifers (33)), and Pteridophyta (cryptogams (408)).

Three families are represented in the literature. Listed taxa include species, subspecies, varieties, and forms as recorded, some of which have subsequently been allocated to other taxa as synonyms, in which cases the accepted taxon is appended to the listing. Multiple entries under alternative names reflect taxonomic revision over time.

Caprifoliaceae
 Family: Caprifoliaceae,

Lonicera
Genus Lonicera:
 Lonicera japonica Thunb. not indigenous, naturalised
 Lonicera japonica Thunb. var. japonica, not indigenous, naturalised

Sambucus
Genus Sambucus:
 Sambucus canadensis L. not indigenous, naturalised, invasive
 Sambucus nigra L. not indigenous, naturalised, invasive
 Sambucus nigra L. var. canadensis (L.) B.L.Turner, accepted as Sambucus canadensis L. not indigenous, naturalised

Dipsacaceae
 Family: Dipsacaceae,

Cephalaria
Genus Cephalaria:
 Cephalaria armerioides Szabo, endemic
 Cephalaria attenuata (L.f.) Roem. & Schult. endemic
 Cephalaria decurrens (Thunb.) Roem. & Schult. endemic
 Cephalaria foliosa Compton, indigenous
 Cephalaria galpiniana Szabo, indigenous
 Cephalaria galpiniana Szabo subsp. galpiniana, indigenous
 Cephalaria galpiniana Szabo subsp. simplicior B.L.Burtt, indigenous
 Cephalaria humilis (Thunb.) Roem. & Schult. endemic
 Cephalaria natalensis Kuntze, indigenous
 Cephalaria oblongifolia (Kuntze) Szabo, indigenous
 Cephalaria pungens Szabo, indigenous
 Cephalaria rigida (L.) Roem. & Schult. endemic
 Cephalaria scabra (L.f.) Roem. & Schult. endemic
 Cephalaria wilmsiana Szabo, endemic
 Cephalaria zeyheriana Szabo, indigenous

Scabiosa
Genus Scabiosa:
 Scabiosa africana L. endemic
 Scabiosa albanensis R.A.Dyer, endemic
 Scabiosa angustiloba (Sond.) Hutch. endemic
 Scabiosa buekiana Eckl. & Zeyh. endemic
 Scabiosa columbaria L. indigenous
 Scabiosa drakensbergensis B.L.Burtt, indigenous
 Scabiosa incisa Mill. endemic
 Scabiosa lanata Hill, accepted as Hermas lanata (Hill) Magee 
 Scabiosa transvaalensis S.Moore, endemic
 Scabiosa tysonii L.Bolus, endemic

Valerianaceae
 Family: Valerianaceae,

Centranthus
Genus Centranthus:
 Centranthus ruber (L.) DC. not indigenous, naturalised, invasive

Valeriana
Genus Valeriana:
 Valeriana capensis Thunb. indigenous
 Valeriana capensis Thunb. var. capensis, indigenous
 Valeriana capensis Thunb. var. lanceolata N.E.Br. indigenous
 Valeriana capensis Thunb. var. nana B.L.Burtt, indigenous

References

South African plant biodiversity lists
Dipsacales